Coalburg is an unincorporated community in Kanawha County, West Virginia, United States. Coalburg is located along the south bank of the Kanawha River, west of East Bank.

The William H. & William S. Edwards House and Good Shepherd Church were listed on the National Register of Historic Places in 1990.

References

Unincorporated communities in Kanawha County, West Virginia
Unincorporated communities in West Virginia
Coal towns in West Virginia
Populated places on the Kanawha River